An ocular manifestation of a systemic disease is an eye condition that directly or indirectly results from a disease process in another part of the body. There are many diseases known to cause ocular or visual changes. Diabetes, for example, is the leading cause of new cases of blindness in those aged 20–74, with ocular manifestations such as diabetic retinopathy and macular edema affecting up to 80% of those who have had the disease for 15 years or more. Other diseases such as acquired immunodeficiency syndrome (AIDS) and hypertension are commonly found to have associated ocular symptoms.

Systemic allergic diseases 
Asthma
Atopic dermatitis
Atopic eczema
Hay fever
Urticaria
Vernal conjunctivitis

Skin and mucous membrane diseases 
Acne rosacea
Albinism
Atopic dermatitis
Behçet's disease
Cicatricial pemphigoid
Ehlers–Danlos syndrome
Epidermolysis bullosa
Erythema multiforme
Goltz–Gorlin syndrome
Ichthyosis
Incontinentia pigmenti
Nevus of Ota
Pemphigus
Pseudoxanthoma elasticum
Psoriasis
Stevens–Johnson syndrome (Erythema multiforme major)
Vogt–Koyanagi–Harada syndrome
Xeroderma pigmentosum

Phacomatoses
Angiomatosis retinae (Von Hippel–Lindau disease) (retinocerebellar capillary hemangiomatosis)
Ataxia telangiectasia (Louis–Bar syndrome)
Encephalotrigeminal angiomatosis (Sturge–Weber syndrome) (encephalofacial cavernous hemangiomatosis)
Neurofibromatosis (von Recklinghausen's disease)
Tuberous sclerosis (Bourneville's syndrome)
Wyburn–Mason syndrome (racemose hemangiomatosis)

Collagen diseases
Ankylosing spondylitis
Dermatomyositis
Periarteritis nodosa
Reactive arthritis
Rheumatoid arthritis
Ehlers-Danlos Syndrome
Sarcoidosis
Scleroderma
Systemic lupus erythematosus
Temporal arteritis
Relapsing polychondritis
Granulomatosis with polyangiitis 50-60% have ophthalmologic manifestations, which can be a presenting feature in a minority of patients. Orbital disease is the most common manifestation, and may result in proptosis, restrictive ophthalmopathy, chronic orbital pain, and in chronic cases, orbital retraction syndrome and intractable socket pain. Granulomatosis with polyangiitis may also cause inflammation of the optic nerve, ophthalmoplegia, conjunctivitis, keratitis, scleritis, episcleritis, dacrocystitis, nasolacrimnal duct obstruction, dacroadenitis, uveitis, and retinal vasculitis.

Systemic viral infections
Varicella (chickenpox)
Rubeola (measles)
Rubella (German measles)
Variola (smallpox)
Vaccinia
Herpes simplex
Herpes zoster
Mumps
Infectious mononucleosis
Influenza
Cytomegalic inclusion disease
Pharyngoconjunctival fever (adenovirus 3)
Epidemic keratoconjunctivitis (adenovirus 8)
Human immunodeficiency virus (acquired immunodeficiency syndrome)
Ebola
Rift Valley Fever
Dengue
Hantavirus

Systemic bacterial infections
Gonorrhea (ophthalmia neonatorum)
Brucellosis
Diphtheria
Lyme disease
Sepsis (bacterial metastatic endophthalmitis)
Tularemia
Leprosy (Hansen's disease)
Tuberculosis
Syphilis

Systemic protozoal infections 
Lymphogranuloma venereum (chlamydial)
Inclusion conjunctivitis (chlamydial)
Malaria
Toxoplasmosis

Systemic fungal infections 
 Candida albicans
Histoplasmosis
Coccidioidomycosis
Cryptococcus
Metastatic fungal endophthalmitis
Actinomyces
Streptothrix

Systemic cestode and nematode infections 
Cysticercosis (tapeworm)
Echinococcosis (hydatid cyst)
Toxocariasis (toxocara)
Trichinosis (trichinella)
Onchocerciasis
Loiasis (loa loa)

Chromosomal disorders and genetic syndromes
Cri-du chat syndrome
Schmid–Fraccaro syndrome
Turner's syndrome
Ring-D chromosome
Monosomy-G syndrome
Trisomy 13 (Patau's syndrome, D-syndrome)
Trisomy 18 (Edwards' syndrome, E-syndrome)
Trisomy 21 (Down syndrome)
Deletion of long arm of chromosome 18
Deletion of chromosome 18
Ciliopathic genetic syndromes—A number of widely variant genetic disorders with occular phenotypes have been identified with genotypical ciliopathy.

Hematologic diseases
Anemia

Cardiovascular diseases
Cardiovascular diseases
Arteriosclerosis
Hypertension
Pre-eclampsia (toxemia of pregnancy)
Occlusive vascular disease (sudden)
Emboli and thrombi
Central retinal artery occlusion
Cardiac myxoma
Cranial arteritis
Sickle cell attack
Occlusive vascular disease (slow, progressive)
Carotid artery disease
Arterial spasm (TIA)
Diabetes mellitus
Collagen diseases
Venous occlusive disease
Thrombosis
Use of hormonal contraception
Endocarditis
Myxoma
Aortic arch syndrome (takayasu)
Pre-eclampsia (toxemia of pregnancy)
Thromboangiitis obliterans
Hereditary telangiectasia (Rendu–Osler–Weber syndrome)

Endocrine diseases
Cushing's disease
Addison's disease
Diabetes mellitus
Hyperparathyroidism
Hypoparathyroidism
Hyperthyroidism
Hypothyroidism

Gastrointestinal and nutritional disorders
Alcoholism
Crohn's disease
Liver disease
Malnutrition
Peptic ulcer disease
Pancreatic disease
Regional enteritis or ulcerative colitis
Vitamin A deficiency
Vitamin B deficiency
Vitamin C deficiency
Hypervitaminosis A, B, and D
Whipple's disease

Metabolic disorders
Albinism
Alkaptonuria
Amyloidosis
Chediak–Higashi syndrome
Cystinosis
Fabry's disease
Galactosemia
Gaucher's disease
Gout
Hemochromatosis
Histiocytosis
Homocystinuria
Lipidoses
Marfan's syndrome
Weill–Marchesani syndrome
Mucopolysaccharidosis
Niemann–Pick disease
Osteogenesis imperfecta
Wilson's disease

Musculoskeletal disease
Albright's disease (fibrous dysplasia of bone)
Apert syndrome
Conradi's syndrome
Craniofacial syndromes
Facial deformity syndromes
Muscular dystrophy disorders
Myasthenia gravis
Osteogenesis imperfecta
Paget's disease

Pulmonary diseases
Asthma
Bronchogenic carcinoma
Bronchiectasis
Cystic fibrosis of the pancreas
Emphysema
Pneumonias
Tuberculosis

Renal disease
Alport's syndrome
Azotemia (acute and chronic pyelonephritis)
Lowe's syndrome
Medullary cystic disease
Nephrotic syndrome (acute glomerulonephritis, diabetic kidney, system lupus erythematosus)
Renal transplantation
Wilms' tumor (nephroblastoma)

Neoplastic diseases with ocular metastases
Carcinoma and sites of primary lesions
Blood
Leukemia
Lymphoma
Breast
Colon
Kidney
Lung
Genital organs
Ovary or cervix
Testis or prostate
Skin
Melanoma
Gut
Stomach
Pancreas
Thyroid

See also 
 List of cutaneous conditions

References
Pavan-Langston, Deborah (1990). Manual of Ocular Diagnosis and Therapy. Little, Brown and Company.

Visual system
Eye diseases
Ocular
Lists of diseases